Transport World is an Invercargill, New Zealand organisation that invests in tourism in Southland. So far they have four products: Bill Richardson Transport World, Classic Motorcycle Mecca, The Lodges At Transport World and Dig This Invercargill  and have a restaurant and cafe on both Bill Richardson Transport World and Classic Motorcycle Mecca sites. The Grille Cafe is located at Bill Richardson Transport World at 491 Tay Street. Meccaspresso Cafe is located at Classic Motorcycle Mecca at 25 Tay Street. Bill Richardson Transport World and Classic Motorcycle Mecca are transport displays, The Lodges At Transport World are boutique apartment accommodations and Dig This Invercargill is an attraction that allows anyone to operate diggers and heavy construction equipment in a safe and controlled environment.

Bill Richardson Transport World
Bill Richardson Transport World is a  complex full of vehicles and transport-related objects. It also has a construction zone for children, a library with a focus on transport and manuals, and an events and conference centre. Bill Richardson Transport World also displays wearable arts and social history objects. Some highlights of their displays include three of four of John Britten's bikes, including the V1000 Cardinal and a rare 1940 Dodge Airflow truck.

Background
Southland businessman, Bill Richardson was interested in transport from a young age. His first business was a transport company called Southern Transport. Under his guidance, it grew into the HWR Group. When he bought trucks for the business, he had to concede that sometimes he, in his words, 'bought a truck more with our hearts than with our heads.' Transport World's collection began in 1967 when Bill Richardson began collecting old trucks, which by the time of his death in 2005 had grown to 150 vehicles including trucks, and farm vehicles. He also collected petrol pumps and other transport related memorabilia such as signs and toy models. In 2015 Richardson's daughter Jocelyn and her husband Scott O'Donnell decided to open up their collection to the public. A new extension was built and in November 2015 Bill Richardson Transport World was opened.

Collections
Bill and his family collected many rare and unusual vehicles, along with popular classic vehicles. The collection spans from a 1904 Ford Ac car to a 2016 Dub Box caravan.
Collections focus on 
American pre and post-war trucks
British post-war trucks 
Kombi vans 
Pre-Model T Ford cars 
Ford V8 cars 
Classic and modern race cars
HWR company trucks
Agricultural tractors and machinery

Vehicle Highlights
Most of the vehicles in Bill Richardson Transport World are rare, unusual or significant.
Highlights include: 
A 1940 Dodge RX70 Airflow truck: This is one of only several hundred made and one of only three known to be restored in the world.
1914 Stewart 1 ton truck: This truck was built by the Stewart Iron Works of Cincinnati, Ohio, USA who made trucks from 1912 to 1916. This is the only truck of this make believed to exist. 
1932 Mack BG: the first truck to use the Mack Bulldog mascot. 2904 units of this model were made.
1907 Ford Model K car
1924 Gotfredson 20B truck 
1936 Maple Leaf HY: Unusual make, a Chevrolet made in Canada with a Maple Leaf badge on it. 
1962 Kenworth Log Skidder
1974 Begg 018 Formula 5000

Exhibitions
The following exhibitions are on display at Bill Richardson Transport World:
Pork Pie Corner: an exhibit displaying extra footage from the 2017 Pork Pie movie and real movie props, including the 2016 Mini Cooper S used during filming in Invercargill.
Richardson Family story: It tells the story of the Richardson family from when they first came to New Zealand several generations ago to the present day. It also tells the story of life in early New Zealand and Southland business. 
Ford exhibition: exhibit about the Ford Motor Company and Henry Ford.
Mobil exhibition: tells the story of Mobil's history, from its beginnings as Standard Oil to its present structure as ExxonMobil. This is included in Transport World because HWR is the New Zealand distributor for Mobil.
Wearable Art: gallery showcasing wearable art pieces from FibreOctave, an Invercargill event.

Interactive elements
Bill Richardson Transport World has several interactive elements to its attraction:
Construction Zone: children's room full of Lego and tablets with educational games.
Pork Pie Police car: a real decommissioned police car used during the filming of Pork Pie. One of the only decommissioned police cars with accessories still attached.
Replica Goodbye Pork Pie 1978 British Leyland Mini 1000 car: has been reconstructed as it appeared at the end of the movie, with many parts missing.
Jail Scene: 1925 Ford TT Replica Paddy Wagon and mock jail set with dress ups for children. People can access the back to recreate what it was like for a prisoner. 
Majestic Theatre: a replica of Invercargill's Majestic Theatre that plays old movies.

Classic Motorcycle Mecca
Classic Motorcycle Mecca is a display of motorcycles showcased over two floors of a restored warehouse in Invercargill's CBD. Classic Motorcycle Mecca also displays motorcycle-related artwork.

Background
Classic Motorcycle Mecca's collection began in 2008 when Tom Sturgess purchased a 1965 Triumph Cub. By 2014 he had nearly 300 motorcycles and over 80 pieces of motorcycle-related art. In 2016 Tom and Heather Sturgess, owners of NZ Classic Motorcycles, put their motorcycle collection up for sale. Joc and Scott O'Donnell bought most of the bikes and art and moved the collection to two old restored warehouses in Invercargill's CBD. It opened in late 2016.

Motorcycles
The motorcycles on display at Classic Motorcycle Mecca range in age from a 1902 Motosacoche to a one-of-a-kind 2007 Vincent Black Shadow.
Highlights include:
1930 Henderson KJ
1937 Brough Superior SS100
1928 Indian 101 
1928 Indian Scout
1941 Indian Chief  
Six Norton Manx bikes
Several BMW R series
Four Ariel Square Fours
1960 BSA Super Rocket Gold Star
1936 Harley Davidson Knucklehead

Artwork
Highlights include the La Motosacoche – Brevetée en Tous Pays Poster and numerous pieces from the early 20th century.

The Lodges At Transport World
The Lodges At Transport World are boutique apartment accommodation for people visiting Invercargill, Southland. They consist of 6 two bedroom apartments managed by Graeme and Esther Bradford. They were opened in mid-2017.

Dig This Invercargill
Dig This Invercargill is based on the successful Dig This Las Vegas attraction. It allows anyone to operate diggers and heavy construction equipment in a safe and controlled environment. They are expected to be open in late 2017.

References

External links

Invercargill
Companies based in Invercargill
Transport museums in New Zealand
Tourist attractions in New Zealand
New Zealand companies established in 2015